The 1966 George Washington Colonials football team was an American football team that represented George Washington University as part of the Southern Conference during the 1966 NCAA University Division football season. In its sixth season under head coach Jim Camp, the team compiled a 4–6 record (4–3 in the SoCon).

On January 17, 1967, the school's trustees voted to end the football program, making this the Colonials' final season.

Schedule

References

George Washington
George Washington Colonials football seasons
George Washington Colonials football